Gubkin is a Russian masculine surname, its feminine counterpart is Gubkina. It may refer to
Irina Gubkina (born 1972), Russian luger 
Ivan Gubkin (1871–1939), Russian geologist 
Lyudmila Gubkina (born 1973), Belarusian hammer thrower

Russian-language surnames